The Macintosh II is a personal computer designed, manufactured, and sold by Apple Computer from March 1987 to January 1990. Based on the Motorola 68020 32-bit CPU, it is the first Macintosh supporting color graphics. When introduced, a basic system with monitor and 20 MB hard drive cost . This placed it in competition with workstations from Silicon Graphics, Sun Microsystems, and Hewlett-Packard.

The Macintosh II was the first computer in the Macintosh line without a built-in display; a monitor rested on top of the case like the IBM Personal Computer and Amiga 1000. It was designed by hardware engineers Michael Dhuey (computer) and Brian Berkeley (monitor) and industrial designer Hartmut Esslinger (case).

Eighteen months after its introduction, the Macintosh II was updated with a more powerful CPU and sold as the Macintosh IIx.  In early 1989, the more compact Macintosh IIcx was introduced at a price similar to the original Macintosh II, and by the beginning of 1990 sales stopped altogether. Motherboard upgrades to turn a Macintosh II into a IIx or Macintosh IIfx were offered by Apple.

Development 
Two common criticisms of the Macintosh from its introduction in 1984 were the closed architecture and lack of color; rumors of a color Macintosh began almost immediately.

The Macintosh II project was begun by Dhuey and Berkeley during 1985 without the knowledge of Apple co-founder and Macintosh division head Steve Jobs, who opposed expansion slots and color, on the basis that the former complicated the user experience and the latter did not conform to WYSIWYG—color printers were not common. Jobs instead wanted higher-resolution monochrome displays,  such as the ones chosen for his own "BigMac" project begun in 1984 to develop a Macintosh successor.

Initially referred to as "Little Big Mac", the Macintosh II  was codenamed "Milwaukee" after Dhuey's hometown, and later went through a series of new names. After Jobs was fired from Apple in September 1985, the Milwaukee project could proceed openly (while Jobs' own BigMac project was finally cancelled).

The Macintosh II was introduced at the AppleWorld 1987 conference in Los Angeles, with low-volume initial shipments starting two months later. Retailing for US $5,498, the Macintosh II was the first modular Macintosh model, so called because it came in a horizontal desktop case like many IBM PC compatibles of the time. Previous Macintosh computers use an all-in-one design with a built-in black-and-white CRT.

The Macintosh II has drive bays for an internal hard disk (originally 40 MB or 80 MB) and an optional second floppy disk drive. It, along with the Macintosh SE, was the first Macintosh to use the Apple Desktop Bus (ADB) introduced with the Apple IIGS for keyboard and mouse interface.

The primary improvement in the Macintosh II was Color QuickDraw in ROM, a color version of the graphics routines. Color QuickDraw can handle any display size, up to 8-bit color depth, and multiple monitors. Because Color QuickDraw is included in the Macintosh II's ROM and relies on 68020 instructions, earlier systems could not be upgraded to display color.

In September 1988, shortly before the introduction of the Macintosh IIx, Apple increased the list price of the Macintosh II by roughly 20%. AnimEigo notably used the Macintosh II for subtitling their earliest releases, including MADOX-01, Riding Bean, and Vampire Princess Miyu.

Hardware 

CPU: The Macintosh II is built around the Motorola 68020 processor operating at 16 MHz, teamed with a Motorola 68881 floating point unit. The machine shipped with a socket for an optional Motorola 68851 MMU, but an "Apple HMMU Chip" (VLSI VI475 chip) was installed by default and could not implement virtual memory (instead, it translated 24-bit addresses to 32-bit addresses for the Mac OS, which would not be 32-bit clean until System 7).

Memory: The standard memory was 1 megabyte, expandable to 8 MB. The Mac II had eight 30-pin SIMMs, and memory was installed in groups of four (called "Bank A" and "Bank B").

The original Macintosh II did not have a PMMU by default. It relied on the memory controller hardware to map the installed memory into a contiguous address space. This hardware had the restriction that the address space dedicated to bank A must be larger than those of bank B. Though this memory controller was designed to support up to 16 MB 30-pin SIMMs for up to 128 MB of RAM, the original Macintosh II ROMs had problems limiting the amount of RAM that can be installed to 8 MB.  The Macintosh IIx ROMs that also shipped with the FDHD upgrade fixed this problem, though still do not have a 32-bit Memory Manager and cannot boot into 32-bit addressing mode under Mac OS (without the assistance of MODE32). MODE32 contained a workaround that allowed larger SIMMs to be put in Bank B with the PMMU installed. In this case, the ROMs at boot think that the computer has 8 MB or less of RAM. MODE32 then reprograms the memory controller to dedicate more address space to Bank A, allowing access to the additional memory in Bank B. Since this makes the physical address space discontiguous, the PMMU is then used to remap the address space into a contiguous block.

Graphics: The Macintosh II includes a graphics card that supports a true-color 16.7 million color palette and was available in two configurations: 4-bit and 8-bit. The 4-bit model supports 16 colors on a 640×480 display and 256 colors (8-bit video) on a 512×384 display, which means that VRAM was 256 KB. The 8-bit model supports 256-color video on a 640×480 display, which means that VRAM was 512 KB in size. With an optional RAM upgrade (requiring 120 ns DIP chips), the 4-bit version supports 640×480 in 8-bit color. The video card does not include hardware acceleration of drawing operations.

Display: Apple offered a choice of two displays, a 12" black and white unit, and a more expensive 13" high-resolution color display based on Sony's Trinitron technology. More than one display could be attached to the computer, and objects could be easily dragged from one screen to the next. Third-party displays quickly became available. The Los Angeles Times reviewer called the color "spectacular." The operating system user interface remained black and white even on color monitors with the exception of the Apple logo, which appeared in rainbow color.

Storage: A 5.25-inch 40 MB internal SCSI hard disk was optional, as was a second internal 800 kilobyte 3.5-inch floppy disk drive.

Expansion: Six NuBus slots were available for expansion (at least one of which had to be used for a graphics card, as the Mac II had no onboard graphics chipset and the OS didn't support headless booting). It is possible to connect as many as six displays to a Macintosh II by filling all of the NuBus slots with graphics cards.  Another option for expansion included the Mac286, which included an Intel 80286 chip and could be used for MS-DOS compatibility.

The original ROMs in the Macintosh II contained a bug that prevented the system from recognizing more than one megabyte of memory address space on a Nubus card. Every Macintosh II manufactured until approximately November 1987 had this defect. This happened because Slot Manager was not 32-bit clean. Apple offered a well-publicized recall of the faulty ROMs and released a program to test whether a particular Macintosh II had the defect. As a result, it is rare to find a Macintosh II with the original ROMs.

Accessories: The Macintosh II and Macintosh SE were the first Apple computers since the Apple I to be sold without a keyboard. Instead the customer was offered the choice of the new ADB Apple Keyboard or the Apple Extended Keyboard as a separate purchase. Dealers could bundle a third-party keyboard or attempt to upsell a customer to the more expensive (and higher-profit) Extended Keyboard.

Audio: The Macintosh II was the first Macintosh to have the Chimes of Death accompany the Sad Mac logo whenever a serious hardware error occurred.

The new extensions featured for the Macintosh II at the time were A/ROSE and Sound Manager.

Models 
The Macintosh II was offered in three configurations. All systems included a mouse and a single 800 KB 3.5-inch floppy disk drive; a Motorola 68851 PMMU was available as an option and required for running A/UX.
 Macintosh II CPU: 1 MB RAM.
 Macintosh II 1/40 CPU: 1 MB RAM, internal 40-megabyte SCSI HDD.
 Macintosh II 4/40 CPU: 4 MB RAM, internal 40-megabyte SCSI HDD.

Timeline

References

External links

 Mac II profile on Low End Mac
 Macintosh II technical specifications at apple.com

 
II
II
II
II
Computer-related introductions in 1987